Peter Rothmann Rasmussen (born March 26, 1993), better known as dupreeh, is a Danish professional Counter-Strike: Global Offensive player for Team Vitality. He has played for Team Dignitas, Team SoloMid and Astralis. In 2019, he became the first (along with three of his teammates) to win 4 majors in CS:GO, and to win 3 majors consecutively.

He was sidelined during ESL One Cologne 2016 after developing appendicitis on July 6, 2016. Rasmussen left Astralis in December 2021, along with Emil "Magisk" Reif and coach Danny "zonic" Sørensen. All three joined Team Vitality in January 2022.

Notes

References

External links

 

1993 births
Living people
Danish esports players
Astralis players
Team SoloMid players
Dignitas (esports) players
Counter-Strike players